Sherri DuPree-Bemis (born December 3, 1983) is a musician, singer, songwriter and guitarist from Texas. She is one of the primary vocalists and songwriters for the band Eisley. Dupree-Bemis is also a guest vocalist for many other projects, as well as a visual artist.

Career
Three of her siblings, Chauntelle, Stacy, and Weston DuPree, were also members of Eisley, along with her cousin, Garron DuPree. Her youngest sister Christie has also occasionally performed with them live. After the departure of her siblings, Dupree-Bemis became Eisley's primary singer and songwriter. Her drawings can be seen on much of the Eisley merchandise, as well as on most of their album artwork. DuPree-Bemis appears on various songs with sister Stacy, including "Dance Party Plus" by Head Automatica and "Unglued" by Fair. Stacy and Sherri contributed vocals to the album Cassadaga by Bright Eyes while in Malibu for the recording of their second full-length album, Combinations. DuPree-Bemis also sang a verse for a song on Brighten's album King vs. Queen, and she sings during the Two Tongues track "Interlude" on the supergroup's self-titled 2009 album, as well as the second interlude on their second LP. DuPree-Bemis first contributed vocals to tracks on Say Anything's self-titled album and has since been featured every subsequent album by the band. She is the co-singer-songwriter of the band Perma, with her husband Max Bemis of the band Say Anything.

Personal life
DuPree is divorced from musician Chad Gilbert of the band New Found Glory. She then married musician Max Bemis. In February 2013, Bemis announced the birth of their first child. Their second child was born in February 2015. Their third child was born in April 2018.
On April 6, 2020, DuPree gave birth to their fourth child. Their fifth child was born on July 4, 2021.

Discography 
Eisley

 Room Noises (2005)
 Combinations (2007)
 The Valley (2011)
 Currents (2013)
 I'm Only Dreaming (2017)

Perma
 Two of a Crime (2013)
 Fight Fair (2019)

References

External links 
 
 Official Eisley MySpace page

1983 births
Living people
People from Tyler, Texas
21st-century American singers
21st-century American women singers